Primetime News is the flagship news programme on Singapore's Channel NewsAsia. The programme was broadcast every day at 9:00 pm in Singapore (13:00 UTC) and ran for 30 minutes. It previously ran at 8:00 pm Singapore time for one hour. The programme covers all of the daily headlines from Singapore and abroad.

The show was formerly called Channel NewsAsia Tonight from 1 March 1999 until 31 August 2001 before some of Channel NewsAsia's live news programmes were renamed and revamped.

The last edition of Primetime News aired on 20 January 2013 before an overhaul on Channel NewsAsia's broadcast on 21 January 2013.

Presenters
Melissa Hyak (weekdays)
Sushila Krishnan (weekends)
Gerard Lam (weekends)
David Nye (weekends)
Timothy Go (relief)
Genevieve Woo (relief)
Glenda Chong
Melvin Young
Suzanne Ho
Shankar Aiyar

Singaporean television news shows